The year 2010 is the 2nd year in the history of Tachi Palace Fights, a mixed martial arts promotion based in The United States. In 2010 Tachi Palace Fights held 5 events beginning with, TPF 3: Champions Collide.

Title fights

Events list

TPF 3: Champions Collide

TPF 3: Champions Collide was an event held on February 4, 2010 at the Tachi Palace in Lemoore, California.

Results

TPF 4: Cinco de Mayhem

TPF 4: Cinco de Mayhem was an event held on May 5, 2010 at the Tachi Palace in Lemoore, California.

Results

TPF 5: Stars and Strikes

TPF 5: Stars and Strikes was an event held on July 9, 2010 at the Tachi Palace in Lemoore, California.

Results

TPF 6: High Stakes

TPF 6: High Stakes was an event held on September 9, 2010 at the Tachi Palace in Lemoore, California.

Results

TPF 7: Deck the Halls

TPF 7: Deck the Halls was an event held on December 2, 2010 at the Tachi Palace in Lemoore, California.

Results

See also 
 Tachi Palace Fights

References

Tachi Palace Fights events
2010 in mixed martial arts